The Mask of Janus was a British television series produced by the BBC in 1965, and starred Dinsdale Landen as counter espionage agent Richard Cadell.

The series was set in the fictional European country of Amalia and dealt with the political interests of the British, American and Communist espionage communities within. Eschewing the action formula of its ITV contemporaries (e.g. Danger Man and the early seasons of The Avengers), the series dealt with more politically oriented plots such as defections to the west, awakening "sleeper" agents and the leaking of official secrets. As of 2009, seven of the original episodes of this programme are still missing from BBC archives.

A spin-off series called The Spies, also starring Landen, followed in 1966.

External links

Action TV (retrieved from the Internet Archive)

BBC television dramas
Espionage television series
Lost BBC episodes
1960s British drama television series
1965 British television series debuts
1965 British television series endings
Black-and-white British television shows
English-language television shows